Ștefan Vasile (born February 17, 1982) is a Romanian sprint canoer who competed in the mid-2000s. At the 2004 Summer Olympics in Athens, he finished seventh in the K-4 1000 m event while being eliminated in the semifinals of the K-2 500 m event.

References
Sports-Reference.com profile

1982 births
Canoeists at the 2004 Summer Olympics
Canoeists at the 2012 Summer Olympics
Living people
Olympic canoeists of Romania
Romanian male canoeists